Babino is a rural settlement in the Chambellan commune of the Jérémie Arrondissement, in the Grand'Anse department of Haiti.

References

Populated places in Grand'Anse (department)